The 121st Regiment of Foot was an infantry regiment of the British Army, formed in 1762 and disbanded in 1764.

References

External links

Infantry regiments of the British Army
Military units and formations established in 1762
Military units and formations disestablished in 1764